Home is the debut studio album by British drum and bass band Rudimental. It was released on 29 April 2013 by Asylum Records, Atlantic Records and Black Butter Records. The album includes the singles "Spoons", "Feel the Love", "Not Giving In", "Waiting All Night", "Right Here", "Free", "Powerless", and "Give You Up". The album cover features the Hackney Peace Carnival Mural. It was nominated for the 2013 Mercury Prize.

The album's cover depicts Dalston Peace Mural in London.

Individual tracks

Singles
 "Spoons" was released as the album's first single on 20 February 2012. It features vocals from MNEK and Syron, with the treble created with the sounds of spoons, hence the name for the single. It was also released as a free promotional single on iTunes.
 "Feel the Love" was released as the album's second single on 14 May 2012. It features vocals from John Newman. The song peaked at number one in the United Kingdom.
 "Not Giving In" was released as the third single from the album on 18 November 2012. It features vocals from John Newman and Alex Clare. The song peaked at number fourteen in the United Kingdom.
 "Waiting All Night" was released as the fourth single from the album on 14 April 2013. It features vocals from Ella Eyre. The song peaked at number one in the United Kingdom.
 "Right Here" was released as the fifth single from the album on 12 August 2013. It features vocals from Foxes. The song peaked at number fourteen in the United Kingdom.
 "Free" was released as the sixth single from the album on 18 November 2013. It features vocals from Emeli Sandé. The song peaked at number 26 in the United Kingdom.
 "Powerless" was released as the album's seventh single on 23 February 2014. It features vocals from Becky Hill.
 "Give You Up" was released as the eighth single in June 2014, taken from the deluxe edition of the album. It features vocals from Alex Clare. It was featured in the game FIFA 15.

Promotional songs
 "Hell Could Freeze" was released on 14 January 2013 as a promotional single. It was originally intended to be the album's third official single after "Feel the Love" and "Not Giving In". The song was first previewed on 27 November 2012, when it was named the Hottest Record in the World by Zane Lowe on his BBC Radio 1 show. The song features American rapper Angel Haze. It also features additional vocals from Beth Aggett and backing vocals from MNEK. The Skream remix was included on the Waiting All Night EP, the platinum edition of the album and as an American bonus track.
 "Baby" (featuring MNEK and Sinéad Harnett) was first released as the second original track from the Waiting All Night EP. The music video, directed by Rob Rowland, was released on 24 April 2013 to promote the release of the album. A remix competition for the track, promoted by Warner Music UK Limited in collaboration with SoundCloud, was held from 22 August 2013 to 6 October 2013.

Critical reception

The album received generally favourable reviews from music critics, scoring 71 at aggregator website Metacritic. It was nominated for the 2013 Mercury Prize.

Track listing

Platinum edition

Charts and certifications

Weekly charts

Year-end charts

Certifications

Release history

References

2013 debut albums
Rudimental albums
Asylum Records albums
Atlantic Records albums
Black Butter Records albums
Major Tom's albums